Teresa María Rojas is a Cuban writer, educator, director, and actress born in Havana, Cuba.

Biography
Rojas graduated from the University of Havana in 1957 and studied acting at Sala Prometeo, a small theater located in the city. After leaving Cuba in 1960, she went to Venezuela and then to Miami in 1963. Rojas began working as a professor of theater and acting at Miami Dade College (MDC, also formerly known as Miami Dade Community College) in 1972. In 1985, Rojas founded the Prometeo Theater, a bilingual theater group at MDC, serving as its artistic director. More than four hundred students worked in the Prometeo Theater each year.

During her teaching career, Rojas has performed, produced, and directed over ninety plays. In recognition of her teaching, she has been endowed with three teaching chairs. One of her former students, Nilo Cruz, wrote a Pulitzer Prize-winning play in the drama category, Anna in the Tropics. Rojas performed in the play when it returned to Miami after its Broadway debut.

Works or publications

References

External links

 The Teresa María Rojas papers are available at the Cuban Heritage Collection, University of Miami Libraries. This collection documents the activities of Teresa María Rojas in her capacity as a theater actress, theater professor at Miami Dade College, and founder of the Prometeo Student Theater Group. The majority of the materials document Rojas's role as artistic director of the Prometeo Theater and the success of the students who performed in it. Portfolios and reviews contain information regarding her teaching at MDC. The papers contain scrapbooks chronicling her work as director of the Prometeo Theater from 1985. The collection also documents her professional work as an actress in Miami, as well as Cuba and other Latin American countries. Her performances in various acclaimed productions are documented by clippings and photographs.
 Selected photographs, playbills, programs, letters, and clippings from the Teresa María Rojas papers are available through the University of Miami Libraries Digital Collections portal, which also includes a video documentary detailing Rojas's life and work.
 Creator page for Teresa María Rojas in the Cuban Theater Digital Archive.

Cuban stage actresses
Cuban theatre directors
Cuban poets
Living people
Cuban emigrants to the United States
Year of birth missing (living people)
20th-century Cuban educators